The 2009 Black Forest Open was a professional tennis tournament played on outdoor red clay courts. It was the eleventh edition of the tournament which was part of the 2009 ATP Challenger Tour. It took place in Freudenstadt, Germany between 31 August and 6 September 2009.

Singles entrants

Seeds

 Rankings are as of August 24, 2009.

Other entrants
The following players received wildcards into the singles main draw:
  Ante Bilić
  Nils Langer
  Cedrik-Marcel Stebe
  Jakob Sude

The following players received special exemption into the singles main draw:
  Dustin Brown

The following players received entry from the qualifying draw:
  Sascha Klör
  Lars Pörschke
  Louk Sorensen
  Clint Thomson

Champions

Singles

 Jan Hájek def.  Laurent Recouderc, 2–6, 6–3, 7–6(5)

Doubles

 Jan Hájek /  Dušan Karol def.  Martin Kližan /  Adil Shamasdin, 4–6, 6–4, [10–5]

External links
Official site
ITF Search 

Black Forest Open
Black Forest Open
2009 in German tennis
2000s in Baden-Württemberg